The Natural History of Iceland is a natural history of Iceland by Danish lawyer Niels Horrebow. It was published in Danish in 1752, with an English translation in 1758.

History of the work

The book was intended to correct errors in past natural histories of Iceland, particularly the work of Hamburg mayor Johann Anderson, who had written about the island without ever actually visiting it. Anderson had relied entirely on accounts from German and Dutch sea captains, but Horrebow lived in Iceland for two years, studying the animals, plants, weather, and geological features. He also made note of the cultural practices of the Icelandic people. Horrebow's resulting work was published in Danish in 1752, then translated into German (1753), Dutch (1754), English (1758) and French (1764).

"Concerning Snakes"

The Natural History of Iceland is often noted for its seventy-second chapter, "Concerning Snakes", which, in its English translation, consists solely of one sentence:

Several works of English literature make light of this brief passage. For example, James Boswell's Life of Johnson (1791) relates how Samuel Johnson bragged to a friend that he could recite the chapter in its entirety.
And William Morris' utopian novel News From Nowhere (1890) contains a short chapter called "Concerning Politics", in which a resident of "Nowhere" tells the narrator, "We are very well off as to politics,—because we have none. If you ever make a book out of this conversation, put this in a chapter by itself, after the model of old Horrebow's Snakes in Iceland."

The original Danish version of the chapter on snakes was actually a full paragraph, rather than just one sentence. It was a direct response to a paragraph in Johann Anderson's book, which claimed that snakes could not survive the cold of Iceland. Horrebow's full chapter was translated into English in an 1870 issue of Notes and Queries:

Although the contributor to Notes and Queries remarked that "Horrebow's chapter is ... not so ridiculous as generally supposed", the earlier English translation of the chapter is still much better-known. The phrase "snakes in Iceland" is listed in the Oxford English Dictionary, where it is traced to the 1758 translation and defined as "something posited only to be dismissed as non-existent".

Notes

External links
An excerpt from the book, concerning Icelandic houses

1752 books
Danish non-fiction books
Natural history books
Books about Iceland
Environment of Iceland
1752 in science